The 2020–21 Chicago Blackhawks season was the 95th season for the National Hockey League franchise that was established on September 25, 1926. The Blackhawks were led by Jeremy Colliton in his second full year as head coach. 

On December 20, 2020, the league announced a shortened 56-game season and realignment into four divisions with no conferences for the season due to the COVID-19 pandemic and the ongoing closure of the Canada-United States border. As a result of this realignment, the Blackhawks remained in the Central Division and only played games against the teams in their realigned division during the regular season.

On May 3, the Blackhawks were eliminated from playoff contention after a 5–2 loss to the Carolina Hurricanes.

Blackhawk captain Jonathan Toews missed the entire season due to an undisclosed injury which was later revealed to be chronic immune response syndrome.

The season also marked the last season with the Blackhawks for defenseman Duncan Keith who was traded after the season.

Standings

Schedule and results

Regular season
The regular season schedule was published on December 23, 2020.

Detailed records

Player statistics

Skaters

Goaltenders

†Denotes player spent time with another team before joining the Blackhawks. Stats reflect time with the Blackhawks only.
‡Denotes player was traded mid-season. Stats reflect time with the Blackhawks only.
Bold/italics denotes franchise record.

Transactions
The Blackhawks have been involved in the following transactions during the 2020–21 season.

Trades

Draft picks

Below are the Chicago Blackhawks's selections at the 2020 NHL Entry Draft, which was originally scheduled for June 26–27, 2020 at the Bell Center in Montreal, Quebec.

Notes

References

Chicago Blackhawks seasons
Blackhawks
2020 in sports in Illinois
2021 in sports in Illinois